Warren Shire is a local government area in the Orana region of New South Wales, Australia. The Shire is located adjacent to the Macquarie River and the Mitchell and Oxley Highways.  The use of the area is mainly for wool and cotton growing.

The shire was formed on 1 January 1957 through the amalgamation of Marthaguy Shire with the Municipality of Warren. The shire includes the regional towns of Warren and Nevertire.

The Mayor of Warren Shire Council is Cr. Milton Quigley, who is unaligned with any political party.

Demographics

Council

Current composition and election method
Warren Shire Council is composed of twelve councillors elected proportionally as four separate wards, each electing three councillors. All councillors are elected for a fixed four-year term of office. The mayor is elected by the councillors at the first meeting of the council. The most recent election was due to be held on 10 September 2016. However, in all four Wards only three candidates per Ward, being those below, nominated for election. There being no additional candidates, the election for all four Wards was uncontested. The makeup of the council is as follows:

The current Council, elected in 2016, in alphabetical order by Ward, is:

See also

List of local government areas in New South Wales

References

 
Local government areas of New South Wales
1957 establishments in Australia
Populated places established in 1957